Peterson's Magazine (1842–1898) was an American magazine focused on women. It was published monthly and based in Philadelphia.

In 1842, Charles Jacobs Peterson and George Rex Graham, partners in the Saturday Evening Post, agreed that a new women's journal to compete with Godey's Lady's Book would be a good venture.  Peterson launched Ladies' National Magazine as a cheaper alternative to Godey's ($2 per year instead of $3) in January 1842.  Ann S. Stephens was an early editor and substantial contributor to the periodical, and there was some attempt to portray her as running the show (for marketing purposes, perhaps), although Peterson was still in charge.  Emily H. May was another early and frequent contributor.  The name of the publication had some variation in its early years, but by 1848 was titled Peterson's Ladies' National Magazine, and the Peterson prefix would always remain.  From 1855 to 1892, it was called Peterson's Magazine, and thus by that name it is remembered.

Frank Munsey, the media consolidator, purchased the magazine in 1898, and combined it into Argosy magazine.

References

External links
Samples of issues of Peterson's Magazine available online:
 Ladies' National Magazine (January–June 1848) (online via Google books)
 Peterson's Magazine (January–June 1850) (online via Google books)
 Peterson's Magazine (January–June 1876) (online via Google books)
 Peterson's Magazine (January–December 1887) (Vol. 91-92) (online via Google books)

Defunct women's magazines published in the United States
Magazines established in 1842
Magazines disestablished in 1898
Magazines published in Philadelphia
Monthly magazines published in the United States
Women's fashion magazines